"Volcano Girls" is a single by the American alternative rock band Veruca Salt, released in 1997 on their album Eight Arms to Hold You.

Background
It was written by Nina Gordon who also sang lead vocals, with Louise Post performing backup vocals. This song was used at the beginning of the dark comedy movie Jawbreaker, released in 1999.  The song was also featured as a playable track in the 2008 video game, Guitar Hero On Tour: Decades. "Volcano Girls" features a partial interpolation of the lyrics to The Beatles' "Glass Onion", and also includes a reference to Veruca Salt's earlier single "Seether".

Music video
The highly energetic music video for "Volcano Girls" was shot over two days at Essenay in Chicago, Illinois, in 1997. This video consists of the band in the central arena attached to bungee cords, on which Post (right side and airborne), Nina Gordon (left side and performing), and other band members bounce erratically. The video also shows Post and Gordon performing the song while a camera circles around them. Surrounding this arena stand a group of fans, watching them perform several takes of the song.

Charts

References 

1997 singles
1997 songs
Veruca Salt songs
Geffen Records singles
Songs written by Nina Gordon
Song recordings produced by Bob Rock